Aleksandar Goranov (born 7 May 1988) is a Bulgarian footballer, currently playing as a defender for Botev Ihtiman.

Career

Botev Ihtiman
In October 2019 it was confirmed, that Goranov had joined OFC Botev Ihtiman.

References

External links
 
 Profile at Sportal

1988 births
Living people
Bulgarian footballers
First Professional Football League (Bulgaria) players
PFC Marek Dupnitsa players
PFC Kom-Minyor players
PFC Nesebar players
PFC Akademik Svishtov players
FC Hebar Pazardzhik players
FC Lokomotiv Gorna Oryahovitsa players
PFC Lokomotiv Plovdiv players
FC Sozopol players
FC Lokomotiv 1929 Sofia players
Association football defenders